SS Beaver State (T-ACS-10) is a crane ship in ready reserve for the United States Navy.  The ship was named for the state of Oregon, which is also known as the Beaver State.

History 

Beaver State was laid down on 13 April 1964, as the break-bulk freighter, SS Mormacdraco, ON 299008, IMO 6507921, a Maritime Administration type (C4-S-60a) hull, under MARAD contract (MA 144). Built by Ingalls Shipbuilding Inc., Pascagoula, MS, hull no. 487, she was launched on 14 January 1965 and delivered to MARAD 28 May 1965, for service with Moore-McCormack Lines.  In 1976 the ship was lengthened and converted to a partial container ship by Todd Ship Yard, Galveston, TX. She was sold to United States Lines in 1983 and renamed SS American Draco, 13 September. US Lines ceased operations in 1986 and the ship was turned over to the MARAD on 2 April 1987 and placed in the National Defense Reserve Fleet (NDRF). The ship was selected for conversion to a MARAD type (C6-S-MA60b) crane ship, but conversion was canceled, 12 January 1990. Conversion resumed in 1992, but was not completed by National Steel and Shipbuilding Co., San Diego, CA until 4 May 1997, when she was placed in service as SS Beaver State (T-ACS-10) and assigned to the Ready Reserve Force (RRF), under operation control of the Military Sealift Command (MSC).  Beaver State was berthed at Bremerton, WA. and assigned to Maritime Prepositioning Ship Squadron Three and was maintained in a five-day readiness status.  She was removed from MSC control and withdrawn from the RRF by reassignment to the NDRF on 28 July 2006.  She was converted for the Missile Defense Agency at Cascade General Shipyards, Portland, OR. to an X-Band Transportable Radar Ship, designated (XTR-1) and renamed SS Pacific Tracker, 1 April 2009.

References

Notes

Bibliography

Online 
 NavSource Naval History

External links 
 SS Beaver State (T-ACS-10)
 Property Management and Archival Record System
 SS Pacific Tracker: Proof Old Ships Are Worth Something

 

Ships built in Pascagoula, Mississippi
1965 ships
Keystone State-class crane ships